Jon Åge Tyldum (born 26 October 1968) is a former Norwegian biathlete. He won the overall World Cup in 1992 and 1995. At the World Championships he has won seven medals. In 1998 he retired from the sport.

Biathlon results
All results are sourced from the International Biathlon Union.

Olympic Games

World Championships
7 medals (1 gold, 5 silver, 1 bronze)

*During Olympic seasons competitions are only held for those events not included in the Olympic program.
**Pursuit was added as an event in 1997.

Individual victories
2 victories (2 Sp)

*Results are from UIPMB and IBU races which include the Biathlon World Cup, Biathlon World Championships and the Winter Olympic Games.

References

External links
 

1968 births
Living people
People from Snåsa
Norwegian male biathletes
Biathletes at the 1992 Winter Olympics
Biathletes at the 1994 Winter Olympics
Olympic biathletes of Norway
Biathlon World Championships medalists
Sportspeople from Trøndelag